Raúl Ruiz or Raul Ruiz may refer to:
Raúl Ruiz (director) (1941–2011), Chilean filmmaker
Raul Ruiz (journalist), American journalist and Chicano activist
Raul Ruiz (politician) (born 1972), United States congressman
Raúl Ruiz Matarín (born 1990), Spanish footballer